Herrington is an English surname. Notable people with the surname include:

Arthur William Sidney Herrington (1891–1970), English-American engineer
Billy Herrington (1969–2018), American actor
Daniel Herrington (born 1986), American racing driver
Danielle Herrington (born 1993), American model
Danny Herrington (c.1960–2005), British rugby player 
David Herrington, English cinematographer
James Herrington (1824–1890), American politician
John Herrington (born 1958), American astronaut
John S. Herrington (born 1939), American politician
Maycie Herrington (1918–2016), American history conservator
Rowdy Herrington (born 1951), American film director and screenwriter
Stuart A. Herrington, American counterintelligence officer and writer
Terrance Herrington (born 1966), American runner
William B. Herrington (born 1979), American Educator

See also
 Herington, a surname

English-language surnames